Greet Death is an American rock band from Flint, Michigan. Greet Death has released two full-length albums.

History 
Greet Death released their first full-length album in 2017 titled Dixieland. The album was released through Flesh and Bone Records. The band was featured as one of Alternative Press's "10 up-and-coming artists from Detroit you need to know". In 2019, Greet Death released their second full-length album titled New Hell, also through Deathwish Inc.

Band members 
 Samuel Boyhtari – vocals, guitar
 Logan Gaval – vocals, guitar
 Jackie Kalmink – bass
 Jimmy Versluis – drums

Former members
 Anthony Spak – drums

Discography

Studio albums 
Dixieland (2017, Flesh and Bone)
New Hell (2019, Deathwish Inc.)

EPs 
In Heaven//Your Lull (2016, Flesh and Bone)
New Low (2022, Deathwish Inc.)

References 

Rock music groups from Michigan
Year of establishment missing